Bulbophyllum averyanovii is a species of orchid in the genus Bulbophyllum.

References

The Internet Orchid Species Photo Encyclopedia

averyanovii